Mahisha or Mahishaka was a kingdom in ancient India. The capital, Mahishuru, is currently known as Mysore, a city in Karnataka. This kingdom is mentioned in Mahabharata, though Puranas (especially Markandeya Purana) gives more information. The name Mahisha means great, powerful.

History
King Mahisha built a vast kingdom with Mahishuru as its center, which was the Mahisha kingdom. The name of 'Mysore', came from its ruler Mahisha.

In the Mahabharata
Bhisma Parva, Mahabharata, Book VI, Chapter 10 describes geography and provinces of ancient India. Mahisha is mentioned in Mahabharata- "There are other kingdoms in the south. They are the Dravidas, the Keralas, the Prachyas, the Mushikas, and the Vanavashikas; the Mahishakas, the Vikalpas, the Mushakas.....".

Karna Parva, Mahabharata Book VIII, Chapter 30 mentions the tribes who are not followers of Brahmanism- "The Karasakaras, the Mahishakas, the Kalingas, the Kikatas, the Atavis, the Karkotakas, the Virakas, and other peoples of no religion, one should always avoid."

Yudhishthira's Rajasuya sacrifice
Yudhishthira, the Kuru king, performed a Rajasuya sacrifice in order to again imperial sovereignty. All his brothers went on extensive military campaigns to extract tribute from all the kingdoms and subjugate those who refused to do so.

'A battle took place between Arjuna and the Dravidas and Andhras and the fierce Mahishakas and the hillmen of Kolwa. Subjugating those tribes without having to accomplish any fierce feats, Arjuna proceeded to the country of the Surashtras, his footsteps guided by the horse.' (14,83)

See also
Kingdoms of Ancient India
Mushika Kingdom

References

Sources

Mahabharata of Krishna Dwaipayana Vyasa, translated to English by Kisari Mohan Ganguli

External links

Kingdoms in the Mahabharata
Daityas